The Begich Towers Condominium is a building in the small city of Whittier, Alaska. The structure is notable for being the residence for nearly the entire population of the city as well as containing many of its public facilities. This has earned Whittier the nickname of a "town under one roof".

History
The area where modern-day Whittier sits was developed during World War II, when it was chosen as the place to build a military harbor and a logistics base for the US Army. After the war, the military planned to develop a large complex in the area. What is now the Begich Towers was part of that plan.

The building was designed in 1953 to host the headquarters of the US Army Corps of Engineers. It was named the Hodge Building in memory of Colonel William Walter Hodge, commander of the 93rd Engineer Regiment on the Alcan Highway. The Hodge Building was part of a larger project meant to include the construction of ten other similar buildings for military use. Construction started with the Hodge Building, along with the Buckner Building  to the northeast, with both opening in 1957. Despite the ambitious plan, these buildings were the only two to be built, and they were used by the US Army until the early 1960s; the Buckner Building has been abandoned since 1966.

In 1964, the area was hit by a tsunami caused by the Good Friday earthquake, but the damage was not extensive. The Hodge Building was transformed into a public building with several units, including the headquarters of the major institutions and commercial services of Whittier.

In 1972, the building was renamed Begich Towers Condominium, in memory of Nick Begich, a Congressman from Alaska who disappeared in the area and is presumed to have died in a plane crash. In 1974, the Begich Towers Condominium Association of Apartment Owners Inc. became the official manager of the entire structure. 

With most of the community and its services either inside of or connected to the building, residents are able to remain inside the building for long periods of time if the weather is inclement, or they simply do not want to leave.

Features

Completed in 1957, the building has a rectangular plan and a flat roof. It is 14 floors high and is made up of three modules connected together. The north side has two protruding modules that form two square towers. Inside, sets of branched corridors and elevators allow residents access to all areas of the complex. The school is connected to the towers via a tunnel.

In addition to the residential areas, the building contains the basic services for condo owners and guests: a post office, a general store and a laundromat. There is also a small Baptist church, two floors of bed and breakfast daily rentals, a conference room, and an indoor playground at the school.

Mechanical systems
During the U.S. military's tenure in Whittier, all Whittier buildings had their hydronic heating needs fulfilled by a single heating plant. Following the Army's departure, each building had to get its own system, including the Begich Towers, which had a pair of boilers in a side building. 

As of 2015, only one of the two boilers serving Begich Towers was functional, but it experienced major maintenance-related issues almost daily. The problems were traced back to the hydronic loop using water, which was susceptible to freezing, instead of a mixture of domestic water and glycol, which lowers the freezing point and prevents pipes from bursting due to ambient temperature drops below zero degrees Celsius.

As of 2016, funding for repairs relating to maintaining mechanical systems and renovating the façade came with a $3 million grant from the U.S. Department of Agriculture.

References

External links

1952 establishments in Alaska
Apartment buildings in Alaska
Buildings and structures in Chugach Census Area, Alaska
Government buildings completed in 1952
Office buildings in Alaska
Residential buildings completed in 1952
Residential skyscrapers in Alaska